Trevor S. Valle (born 27 October 1975) is an American paleontologist and wildlife biologist. In addition to his extensive career in paleontology he has also served as personality on several notable paleontology and wildlife television programs and documentaries.

Some of Valle's most notable appearances in the media were: Dirty Jobs (2009), Ice Age: Dawn of the Dinosaurs (2009), Mysteries at the Museum (2010), Life After People (2010, 2011), Big History (2013), Doomsday: 10 Ways The World Will End (2016), and National Geographic's Mammoths Unearthed (2015). One of his more recognized appearances came when he was a guest of The Joe Rogan Experience podcast in 2014 and 2016. During his 2016 appearance he debunked numerous dinosaur conspiracy theories. He has since made public statements that he was embarrassed of the appearances, and is staunchly opposed to the "Transphobes. Racists. Pseudoscientists. Anti-scientists. Anti-Semitics. Holocaust deniers. Sexists. Conspiracists." he states are given a platform on the podcast.  

Throughout Valle's paleontology career he has worked with the Natural History Museum of Los Angeles County and other non-profit organizations in Southern California. He has been on numerous digs throughout the United States, Siberia, and South America. He is currently a mitigation paleontologist, assisting in the finding and recovery of fossils from construction sites throughout California.

On 20 October 2020, Valle live-tweeted from Los Angeles, California during his experience of having a hemorrhagic stroke. His mobility on his right-side, as well as his speech, were affected.

Media

Television and film

Podcasts

See also 
 List of paleontologists

References

External links
 

1975 births
Living people
People from Los Angeles
American paleontologists
Wildlife biologists
Scientists from California
21st-century American biologists
21st-century American geologists